Redectis is a genus of litter moths of the family Erebidae. The genus was described by Nye in 1975.

Species
Redectis iphias (Schaus, 1916) Cayenne
Redectis perdiccas (Schaus, 1916) Panama
Redectis polyidus (Schaus, 1916)
Redectis pygmaea (Grote, 1878) Texas – pygmy redectis moth
Redectis straminea (Hampson, 1926) Panama
Redectis vitrea (Grote, 1878) New York – white-spotted redectis moth

References

Herminiinae
Moth genera